Calgary-Cross is a current provincial electoral district in Calgary, Alberta, Canada. Created in 1993, the district is one of 87 districts mandated to return a single member (MLA) to the Legislative Assembly of Alberta using the first past the post method of voting.

The district was created in the 1993 boundary redistribution from Calgary-McCall and Calgary-Montrose, and present boundaries covers the neighbourhoods of Whitehorn, Temple, Pineridge and Rundle in northeast Calgary.

History
The electoral district was created in the 1993 boundary re-distribution from the electoral districts of Calgary-McCall and Calgary-Montrose. The district is named after Alfred Ernest Cross (a member of Calgary's Big Four) who entered politics in 1898, and was elected as a Member of the Legislative Assembly (MLA) for East Calgary prior to the formation of Alberta.

The 2010 Alberta boundary re-distribution saw all land east of 68 Street NE distributed to the new Calgary-Greenway electoral district. The west boundary was moved to Deerfoot Trail claiming land that used to be in McCall, Calgary-East and Calgary-North Hill. When created in 2010, the Calgary-Acadia electoral district would have a population of 46,102, which was 12.77 above the provincial average of 40,880.

The 2017 electoral boundary re-distribution saw Calgary-Cross gain the remainder of the Marlborough community from Calgary-East while moving the Abbeydale community to Calgary-East. The boundaries as adjusted would give the electoral district a population of 50,634 in 2017, 8% above the provincial average of 46,803.

Boundary history

Representation history

Calgary-Cross was created from the electoral districts of Calgary-McCall and Calgary-Montrose in the 1993 boundary redistribution. 
Currently, the constituency is represented by Ricardo Miranda.  The first representative was Progressive Conservative member Yvonne Fritz. Prior to representing Montrose she served as an Alderman for the city of Calgary representing the Ward 5 electoral district.

The 1993 election saw Fritz win with a large majority of votes. She sought a second term in 1997 and while her popularity declined she still won very easily over Liberal Keith Jones.

Jones and Fritz would face each other again in the 2001 general election. She would go on to win the district with the largest majority of her career while Jones saw his popular vote collapse. Fritz would win a fourth term in the 2004 general election, seeing almost half her vote disappear.

Fritz became a cabinet minister for the first time in 2004. She won re-election again in 2008.

Legislature results

1993 general election

1997 general election

2001 general election

2004 general election

2008 general election

2012 general election

2015 general election

2019 general election

Senate nominee results

2004 Senate nominee election district results

Voters had the option of selecting 4 Candidates on the Ballot

2012 Senate nominee election district results

Student Vote results

2004 election

On November 19, 2004 a Student Vote was conducted at participating Alberta schools to parallel the 2004 Alberta general election results. The vote was designed to educate students and simulate the electoral process for persons who have not yet reached the legal majority. The vote was conducted in 80 of the 83 provincial electoral districts with students voting for actual election candidates. Schools with a large student body that reside in another electoral district had the option to vote for candidates outside of the electoral district then where they were physically located.

2012 election

See also
List of Alberta provincial electoral districts

References

External links
Elections Alberta
The Legislative Assembly of Alberta

Alberta provincial electoral districts
Politics of Calgary